Sławomir Ryszard Nowak (born 11 December 1974 in Gdańsk) is a Polish politician and a state official in Ukraine. He was elected to the Sejm on 25 September 2005, getting 9,061 votes in 25 Gdańsk district as a candidate from the Civic Platform list.

He was also a member of Sejm 2001-2005.

Nowak served as head of the electoral staff of a candidate for President of Poland, Bronisław Komorowski, during the 2010 presidential election.

From 18 November 2011 to 27 November 2013 he served as Minister of Transport, Construction and Maritime Economy.

On 24 October 2016 he was appointed chief of Ukrainian transport agency Ukravtodor and awarded Ukrainian citizenship. He was dismissed from the post of Ukravtodor's head in September 2019.

On 20 July 2020 Nowak was arrested by Poland's Central Anticorruption Bureau (after a joint investigation with the National Anti-Corruption Bureau of Ukraine) on suspicion of corruption, management of an organized criminal group, and money laundering. According to the National Anti-Corruption Bureau of Ukraine Ukravtodor officials had "created a criminal organization whose activities were aimed at embezzling funds allocated by international organizations for road repairs in Ukraine."

See also
List of Sejm members (2005–2007)
 List of Sejm members (2007–11)
 List of Sejm members (2011–15)

References

External links
Sławomir Nowak - parliamentary page - includes declarations of interest, voting record, and transcripts of speeches.

Members of the Polish Sejm 2005–2007
Members of the Polish Sejm 2001–2005
Civic Platform politicians
1974 births
Living people
Transport ministers of Poland
Government ministers of Poland
Politicians from Gdańsk
Members of the Polish Sejm 2007–2011
Ukrainian government officials
Polish prisoners and detainees
Gdynia Maritime University alumni